Eliza Bent (born May 30, 1982) is an American playwright, performer, and journalist. Her plays have been staged off-broadway at theaters across New York City including: Abrons Art Center, A.R.T., New York Theatre Workshop (Next Door), The Bushwick Starr, and others. She is a founding member of the Brooklyn-based Half Straddle theater company and a graduate of the Brooklyn College MFA program in playwriting.

Produced plays 
Bonnie's Last Flight (New York Theatre Workshop Next Door, 2019) 
Indeed, Friend! (Clubbed Thumb, workshop production, 2018)
Aloha, Aloha, or When I Was Queen (Abrons Arts Center commission 2018))
Real Talk / Kip Talk (Abrons Arts Center commission 2016/17))
On a Clear Day I Can See to Elba (Atlantic Theater Amplified Series, 2017; New Ohio’s ICE Factory, 2016)
Toilet Fire (Abrons Arts Center, 2015; JACK, 2015; The Brick, 2016) 
The Beyonce (Breaking String Theatre 2014; Adjusted Realists, 2018) 
Asleep at the Wheel (workshop production, Brooklyn College, 2015)
Blue Wizard / Black Wizard (Incubator Arts Project, 2013; Other Forces, 2014) 
The Hotel Colors (The Bushwick Starr, 2013)
Karma Kharms (or Yarns by Kharms) (Target Margin Lab at The Bushwick Starr, 2012) 
Pen Pals Meet (Iranian Theatre Festival at The Brick, 2011)

Residencies 
LMCC Workspace 2018/19
Berkeley Rep's Ground Floor 2018
SPACE on Ryder Farm 2017 / Working Farm 2016
Target Margin Institute Fellow 2016
Casa Zia Lina 2014
MacDowell Colony 2013

References

External links 
 https://elizabent.wordpress.com/

1982 births
Living people
Writers from Brookline, Massachusetts
American women dramatists and playwrights
Boston College alumni
Brooklyn College alumni
21st-century American women